Die Oog Conservation Area is a tiny  nature reserve within the city of Cape Town, South Africa. 

It is located in the suburb of Bergvliet in the southern portion of Cape Town and includes a lake with an artificial island, a wetland, a garden and a small area of indigenous and endangered Peninsula Granite Fynbos. The recreational area has been planted with indigenous trees such as the unique and striking Silvertree (Leucadendron argenteum), and the wetland is one of the few remaining breeding grounds of the endangered Western Leopard Toad.

See also
 Biodiversity of Cape Town
 List of nature reserves in Cape Town
 Western Leopard Toad
 Peninsula Granite Fynbos
 Cape Lowland Freshwater Wetland

References

Nature reserves in Cape Town
Protected areas of the Western Cape